The Military ranks of the Kingdom of Yugoslavia were the military insignia used by the Royal Yugoslav Armed Forces. It replaced the ranks of the Kingdom of Serbia following the unification of the Kingdom of Serbia into Kingdom SHS (later Kingdom Yugoslavia). After the proclamation of the Socialist Federal Republic of Yugoslavia, the ranks were replaced by the Yugoslav People's Army ranks.

Corps colours

Commissioned officer ranks
The rank insignia of commissioned officers.

Rank flags

Other ranks
The rank insignia of non-commissioned officers and enlisted personnel.

See also 
 Military ranks of Serbia
 Yugoslav People's Army ranks
 Ranks and insignia of the Armed Forces of Serbia and Montenegro

References
Citations

Bibliography

 
 
 

Military ranks of Yugoslavia
Military of the Kingdom of Yugoslavia